God Has Nothing to Do with This Leave Him Out of It is the second studio album by Zambia-born Montreal-based rapper Backxwash. It was self-released on May 28, 2020 through Grimalkin Records. Production was primarily handled by Backxwash herself, along with Fatherfake, Skin and Will Owen Bennett. It features guest appearances from Black Dresses, Fatherfake, Malldate, Skin and Will Owen Bennett. The album won the 2020 Polaris Music Prize.

Critical reception

God Has Nothing to Do with This Leave Him Out of It was met with generally positive reviews from music critics. At Album of the Year, which assigns a normalized rating out of 100 to reviews from mainstream publications, the album received an average score of 88 based on four reviews.

Scott Simpson of Exclaim! wrote that "with most songs clocking in at under three minutes, this release has a real sense of immediacy and urgency while still managing to weave a compelling larger story". Merlin Alderslade of Metal Hammer praised the album, saying "the whole thing is barely more than 20 minutes long, and yet it's packing more ideas than many bands manage in an entire career. And it's fucking brilliant". Lloyd Best of God Is in the TV stated, "a raw and aggressive, mostly self-produced album with a level of honesty that is commendable and a showcase of skill that sets the bar high". Anthony Fantano said: "with its chilling mix of rap, goth, punk, and noise, God Has Nothing to Do With This has a huge impact for such a concise project".

Accolades

Track listing

Personnel
Ashanti "Backxwash" Mutinta – main artist, vocals and producer (tracks 1–4, 6–8, 10), executive producer
Ada Rook – featured artist (track 2), electric guitar
Devi April McCallion – featured artist (track 3)
Nikki "fatherfake" Baldwin – performer and producer (track 5)
MallDate – featured artist (track 6), electric guitar
Skin – performer and producer (track 9)
Will Owen Bennett – featured artist and producer (track 10), executive producer
Mechant Vaporwave – creative director

References

External links

2020 albums
Horrorcore albums
Trap music albums
Self-released albums
Backxwash albums
Polaris Music Prize-winning albums
Albums free for download by copyright owner
LGBT-related albums